Thomas Hawdon (ca.1765 – 24 November 1793) was an organist, instrumentalist, impresario and teacher based in the East Riding of Yorkshire and Newcastle-upon-Tyne.

Life

He was the son of organist Matthias Hawdon. He married Sarah Webster in May 1789 in Hull (she died March 1790), and they had one daughter, Sarah Hawdon (b. March 1790).

In 1790 in conjunction with Charles Avison, he promoted a series of concerts in Newcastle-upon-Tyne.

Appointments

Organist at St Andrew's Church, Newcastle upon Tyne 1783
Organist in Dundee 1783 - 1787
Organist at Holy Trinity Church, Hull 1787 - 1789
Organist of All Saints' Church, Newcastle upon Tyne 1789 - 1793

References

1765 births
1793 deaths
English organists
British male organists
18th-century keyboardists